The West and East Mitten Buttes (also known as the Mittens) are two buttes in the Monument Valley Navajo Tribal Park in northeast Navajo County, Arizona. When viewed from the south, the buttes appear to be two giant mittens with their thumbs facing inwards.

At the End of March and mid-September for a few days only at sunset the Mitten Shadow, a photographer's dream occurs. At this specific time the West Mitten shadow appears on the East Mitten.

The buttes are made of three principal rock layers. The lowest layer is Organ Rock Shale, the middle is de Chelly Sandstone, and the top layer is the Moenkopi Formation, capped by Shinarump Conglomerate.

Gallery

References 

Buttes of Arizona
Landforms of Navajo County, Arizona